The Master of Public Policy and Administration (MPPA), alternatively Master of Public Administration and Policy (MPAP), is one of several professional graduate degrees. It is a two-year multidisciplinary master's program that encompasses course material from a wide range of programs, including the Master of Public Administration (M.P.A.), Master of Public Policy (M.P.P.), Master of Government Policy, Master of Public Affairs, and others. It is a graduate program within the domain of Public Affairs.

The M.P.P.A. degree is one of five graduate programs combining policy and administration in their titles, meaning they are serving both programs within one degree. One example of a university offering the degree is the University of Tennessee at Knoxville, which requires a core curriculum that encompasses a mix of general administration, financial administration, quantitative methods, administrative ethics, and economics courses. At the University of Tennessee and certain other higher-educational institutions, students pick a concentration within either administration or public policy.

Similar degrees
Similar degrees within the domain of Public Affairs include:

 Master of Public Affairs (M.P.A. or M.P.Aff.)
 Master of Public Policy (M.P.P.)
 Master of Public Administration (M.P.A. or M.P.Adm.)
 Master of Public Service (M.P.S.)
 Master of Science in Administration (M.S.A.)
 Master of Science in Management (M.S.M. or M.I.M.)
 Master of Science in Public Affairs
 Master of Science in Public Policy (M.S.P.P.)
 Master of Arts in Law and Diplomacy (M.A.L.D.)
 Master of Arts in International Policy Studies (MAIPS)
 Master of Public Management (M.P.M.)
 Master of Governmental Administration (M.G.A.)
 Master of Urban Planning (M.U.P.)
 Master of City Planning (M.C.P.)
 Master of Regional Planning (M.R.P.)
 Master of Urban and Regional Planning (M.U.R.P.)
 Master of International Affairs (M.I.A.)
 Master of Global Policy Studies (MGPS)
 Master of Nonprofit Organizations (MNPO or MNO)

See also
Public policy degrees
Public policy schools
Master of Public Administration
Master of Public Policy
List of public administration schools

References

Master's degrees
Public policy
Public administration
Academic degrees